Étienne Pélabon (in Occitan : Estève Pelabon - Tolon, 25 January 1745 - Marseille ?, 1 November 1808) was a Provençal Occitan-language writer from the 18th century. He is above all remembered for his play Maniclo (classical norm : Manicla).

Maniclo was staged for the first time in 1789, and according to Occitan scholar Robèrt Lafont, 12,000 copies were printed.

References

External links 
1821 edition (fac simile)
1901 edition

1745 births
1808 deaths
Provençal-language Occitan writers
French male writers